Microstock photography, also known as micropayment photography, is a part of the stock photography industry.  What defines a company as a microstock photography company is that they (1) source their images almost exclusively via the Internet, (2) do so from a wider range of photographers than the traditional stock agencies (including a willingness to accept images from amateur photographers and hobbyists), and (3) sell their images at a very low rate (from US$0.20 to $10 in the US) for a royalty-free (RF) image.

A number of microstock sites also sell vector art, and some sell audio (music) files, Flash animations and video as well as images.

History
The pioneer of microstock photography was Bruce Livingstone, who created iStockphoto, originally a free stock photo site that quickly became an industry phenomenon. Livingstone sold iStockphoto to Getty Images in February 2006 for 50 million. Many other sites sprang up in the years after iStockphoto's inception. Some of the larger ones are Alamy, Bigstock, Fotolia, Depositphotos, 123rf, Featurepics, Picxy, Pond5, Can Stock Photo, Dreamstime and Shutterstock.

After a few years of initial growth, the microstock industry began a period of mergers and acquisitions. The acquisition of iStockphoto by Getty Images in 2006 was followed by acquisition of StockXpert by Jupiterimages during 2006. Consequently, Jupiterimages, a wholly owned subsidiary of Jupitermedia, was bought by Getty Images in 2009 for $96 million in cash and resulted in the closure of StockXpert in 2010 because it was perceived to be non-strategic for Getty compared to iStockphoto. After the sale, Jupitermedia changed its name to WebMediaBrands. BigStockPhoto was purchased by Shutterstock in 2009.

Starting from limited RF license, all agencies added various Extended Licenses; sites based on a "pay-per-download" principle introduced subscription and vice versa. Shutterstock, which was the only 100% subscription-based microstock agency, introduced a pay-per-download scheme and later acquired BigStockPhoto to extend their presence in pay-per-download niche. Newcomer Cutcaster.com extended the pricing model by introducing a model where contributors could set their start price or could choose to use a pricing algorithm and they allowed a buyer to pay the price shown or bid on the content and name their price. Microstock prices were significantly adjusted several times by the respective agencies in the last three years across multiple sites. Many microstock agencies started to sell video in addition to static pictures, and some started to sell sound clips.

2011 marked the first signs of microstock photographers becoming a field of professionals. Photographers with large, market-relevant, or high-quality portfolios now often collaborate with each other and negotiate with less-established agencies for better commissions or search positioning, and the increasing popularity among photographers of photography portfolio management solutions to increase their throughput and improve metadata quality to better align with principles of SEO in image search algorithms.

In 2012, Shutterstock became the first microstock agency to complete an initial public offering. The agency now trades on the New York Stock Exchange under the ticker SSTK.

In December 2014 Adobe acquired Fotolia for 800 million in cash.

Practices and controversy
Each microstock agency uses a different pricing and payment scheme. In some instances the same photo can have several prices. Photographers can upload the same pictures on multiple sites or, with some agencies, become an exclusive supplier and receive an increased commission and additional benefits.

There is no fee to post photos on a microstock agency website. However, microstock agencies do not accept all submitters or all photographs. Each employs a team of reviewers who check every picture submitted for legal issues and technical quality, as well as artistic and commercial merit. Photographers add keywords that help potential buyers filter and find pictures of interest.

Some professional photographers who do not participate believe that microstock devalues the practice of photography, and that the business model is unsustainable. They see the growth of microstock sites as reducing their own incomes. 

A development that counters these critical opinions is the advance of on-demand photography (or crowd sourced photography, photography marketplaces, etc.). With the higher penetration of smartphones with ever-better cameras, most amateurs can create high quality photography wherever they are. Crowd photo services like CrowdFoto.net or imagebrief.com try to tap into this vast potential by giving clients the possibility to publish a request (or briefing) that can be picked up and worked on by literally everybody who finds the briefing on their platform. These services reinstate the traditional model of a client asking a photographer to create a photo, but make use of the broadened number of amateur photographers.

References

External links

Robert Levine, "Photo wars: A $2 billion business gets rough", Business 2.0 magazine, April 2, 2007

Stock photography